Gulella unidentata is a species of very small air-breathing land snail, a terrestrial pulmonate gastropod mollusk in the family Streptaxidae.

This species is endemic to Tanzania.

References

Fauna of Tanzania
Gulella
Taxonomy articles created by Polbot